Parliamentary elections were held in Burundi on 22 October 1982, the first since 1965. Following a constitutional referendum the year before, the country had become a one-party state with the Union for National Progress (UPRONA) as the sole legal party. The party nominated 104 candidates to contest the 52 seats in the enlarged National Assembly. Following the election, in which turnout was reported to be 95%, President Jean-Baptiste Bagaza appointed a further 13 members.

Results

References

Elections in Burundi
1982 in Burundi
One-party elections
Burundi
Election and referendum articles with incomplete results
October 1982 events in Africa